Pan-Netherlands, sometimes translated as Whole-Netherlands, is an irredentist concept which aims to unite the Low Countries (Netherlands, Belgium, and Luxembourg) into a single state. It is an example of Pan-Nationalism.

Some variants do not include Luxembourg. In less common variants, the French Netherlands (Nord-Pas-de-Calais) are also involved in the merger as well as some border territories in Germany (e.g. East Friesland). Some Pan-Netherlandic groups also want to include South Africa due to the relation of the Dutch to the Afrikaners and the Afrikaans language.

The goal is to unite these territories into one multilingual state (unitary, federal or confederal). This differs from Greater Netherlandism which aims to unite all Dutch-speaking areas. The name of this state differs per organization, some commonly used names are the (united/reunited) Netherlands/Low Countries and mainly before 1945 the name Dietsland was also used.

Terminology 
The ideology is often labeled as Pan-Netherlandism (Heel-Nederlandisme) or Pan-Netherlands thought (Heel-Nederlandse gedachte). The terms Burgundism (Bourgondicisme) or Burgundian Thought (Bourgondische Gedachte) are also used, referring to the Burgundian Circle in the 16th century which united the Low Countries.

In the 20th century a movement grew that merely strives for far-reaching cooperation of the existing Benelux countries. This is often referred to as the "Benelux ideal" (Beneluxgedachte), which led to the creation of the similarly named Benelux Union.

In Belgium, both Pan-Netherlandism, as well as Greater Netherlandism are sometimes labeled as "Orangism" but this can be confusing due to the fact that in all Benelux states this term can also refer to the movement that strives for a restoration of power of the Royal House of Orange-Nassau in their region.

History 
After the disintegration of Middle Francia and Lorraine in the late 10th century, the Low Countries were largely united under the Duchy of Lower Lotharingia. Between 1384 and 1482 they were reunited in the form of a personal union under the Duchy of Burgundy as the Burgundian Netherlands. After this, the Low Countries remained united but under Spain as the Habsburg Netherlands, also referred to as the Seventeen Provinces after the centralisation of the polities through the Burgundian Circle. This history of unity ended with the Dutch Revolt.

Attempts at reunion 

At the beginning of the Eighty Years' War the Netherlandic rebels sought to liberate all regions (see Union of Brussels) but failed. This ideal to "free" all of the Low Countries was prominent in the region until the late 17th century. After years of separation between north and south, the prime minister of the short-lived United Belgian States (which roughly encompassed present-day Belgium) Henri van der Noot proposed to reunite with the Dutch. Partly because of this, the Low Countries were united by William I as the United Kingdom of the Netherlands, which in fact encompasses the territory that the Pan-Netherlands movement strives for. King William even claimed the Rhineland for some time. This state ended in 1830, but left behind an Orangist movement seeking re-attachment to the north. It organized local committees and enjoyed limited success at the municipal level. In the 1860s, another proposal was made from the Belgian side by the then Prime Minister, this time for a confederation, but this was rejected.

Shortly after Belgian independence, the progressive and Flemish-minded Belgian-Walloon Lucien Jottrand put forward the idea. In 1857 Belgium already had Pan-Netherlandic organisations, such as the progressive liberal Vlamingen Vooruit, which had members who proposed a Belgo-Dutch federation. It also held an important role in early Socialism in the Benelux region and its Proletarian Internationalism. Before the First World War and during the interwar period, Belgium in particular also had a number of less relevant Pan-Netherlandic groups such as the Verbond der Lage Landen. Between 1934 and 1940, Joris van Severen's Fascist Verdinaso was the greatest propagandist of the Pan-Netherlands ideal. (Right-wing) Pan-Netherlandic circles often represent themselves with the Prince's Flag or the Burgundian Cross.

Post-WW2 

After the Second World War Pan-Netherlands became somewhat of a taboo subject due to its connection to fascism. Nonetheless, Pan-Netherlandic historians held an important position in the creation of the Benelux Economic Union. Pieter Geyl, former advocate for Flemish-Dutch unification, became a Pan-Netherlandic historian and collaborated with several other Pan-Netherlandic historians on books describing one united history of the Low Countries (e.g. Nederlandsche Historiebladen and Algemene Geschiedenis der Nederlanden).

Examples of contemporary Pan-Netherlandic organisations are the; Algemeen-Nederlands Verbond, Baarle Werkgroep, Werkgemeenschap de Lage Landen, Zannekin, Knooppunt Delta and Die Roepstem.

While no major political party supports the idea, several individual politicians do. Academic and member of Belgian party N-VA Matthias Storme argued for a Pan-Netherlands in 2010 in his "Plan-N", saying "Even for Wallonia, it would not be a bad idea to reflect about the possibility to join the Confederation, equally as a separate country.". Karel Anthonissen (ex-chairman of the Belgian Greens) also supports this plan, perhaps including Luxembourg.

Some more moderate groups and individuals argue for further integration of the Benelux Union, which could possibly also lead to a Pan-Netherlandic polity, often as a precursor to European integration, a kind of "Benelux federalism". On February 25, 2013, during the Provincial Reorganization talks of the Rutte II cabinet, such a proposal was made by one Mr. Stevense to the States of South Holland. This was also discussed later at the councils meeting.

Sources 

Irredentism
Belgium–Netherlands relations
Flemish Movement
Politics of the Netherlands
Politics of Belgium
Political movements
Dutch nationalism
Pan-nationalism